Kathryn Paige Halstead (born April 17, 1997) is an American softball player for Athletes Unlimited Softball and a former UCLA Bruin.

Early life
Halstead was born in Upland, California to parents Mari and Ed Halstead. She attended Los Osos High School in Rancho Cucamonga, California from  where she graduated in 2015, and hit .568 as a senior.

UCLA Bruins
Halstead signed with the UCLA Bruins prior to the 2016 season. She graduated in 2019.

Stats

International career
Halstead was selected to represent the United States at the 2016 World Cup of Softball, where the team won a Silver Medal.  She hit .273 in the tournament with a Home Run and 5 RBIs.

Stats

References

1997 births
Living people
UCLA Bruins softball players
People from Rancho Cucamonga, California
People from Upland, California
Sportspeople from San Bernardino County, California
Softball players from California